Tell It... is a live album by saxophonist Willis Jackson which was recorded in New York City in 1964 and released on the Prestige label in 1967. It was the fourth album to be released from the same performance following Jackson's Action!, Live! Action, and Soul Night/Live!.

Reception

Allmusic awarded the album 3 stars stating "It's staunch mid-'60s soul-jazz".

Track listing 
All compositions by Willis Jackson except as indicated
 "I Can't Stop Loving You" (Don Gibson) - 6:34   
 "One Mint Julep" (Rudy Toombs) - 4:05   
 "(Up A) Lazy River" (Hoagy Carmichael, Sidney Arodin) - 3:10   
 "Jumpin' with Symphony Sid" (Lester Young) - 4:00   
 "Tangerine" (Victor Schertzinger, Johnny Mercer) - 3:30   
 "Ebb Tide" (Carl Sigman, Robert Maxwell) - 4:30   
 "Blue Gator" - 6:00   
 "Secret Love" (Sammy Fain, Paul Francis Webster) - 3:30
Recorded at The Allegro in New York City on March 21, 1964

Personnel 
Willis Jackson - tenor saxophone
Frank Robinson - trumpet
Carl Wilson - organ
Pat Martino - guitar
Joe Hadrick  - drums

References 

Willis Jackson (saxophonist) live albums
1967 live albums
Prestige Records live albums